Life metal may refer to:

 An alternative name for Christian metal
 Life Metal (album), a 2019 album by drone metal band Sunn O)))